Suibne moccu Fir Thrí [Suibne moccu Urthrí, Suibhne I] was the sixth abbot of Iona (652–657). His abbacy is obscure, and he appears not to have been from the same kindred, Cenél Conaill, as Columba and most other early Ionan abbots. His abbacy saw a continuation of the evangelization of England and spread of Gaelic churchmen there, with Diuma becoming the first Bishop of Mercia in 656. He died on 11 January 657.

See also

 Corca Fhir Trí

Bibliography
 Sharpe, Richard, Adomnán of Iona: Life of St. Columba, (London, 1995)

657 deaths
Abbots of Iona
7th-century Irish abbots
Irish expatriates in Scotland
Year of birth unknown